Dariusz Szpakowski (born 15 May 1951 in Warsaw) is a popular Polish Sports commentator, working for the Polish TV. He also used to work for the Polish Radio.

Szpakowski, a graduate of Warsaw’s Jan Zamoyski High School and of Jozef Pilsudski University of Physical Education in Warsaw. As a teenager, he played basketball for Legia Warszawa, then began working as a sports journalist. Szpakowski specializes in football. He announced such events as Olympic Games, World Cup Football as well as UEFA European Football Championship, also matches of the Poland National Team and UEFA Champions League.

References 

1951 births
Living people
Journalists from Warsaw
Sports commentators
Recipients of the Silver Cross of Merit (Poland)